Nicholas John Arthur Holmes (born 7 January 1971) is an English singer, best known as the lead vocalist of British gothic metal/doom metal band Paradise Lost and Swedish death metal band Bloodbath.

History and style
Holmes formed Paradise Lost in late 1988 when he and the other band members were barely out of secondary school.

Like other contemporaries of the British death-doom scene (Anathema and My Dying Bride), the band began purely as death metal, with Holmes using a low, guttural death grunt on their early demos and Lost Paradise (1990), Gothic (1991), and Shades of God (1992) full-lengths (though the latter two albums were not exclusively death metal in execution, and Holmes even utilized some clean vocals as well). Beginning with 1993's Icon, the death grunts were discarded entirely in favour of a raw but decipherable James Hetfield-like bellow. When the band yet again transitioned stylistically with 1997's One Second, Holmes' vocals took on a more gothic rock croon, which remained his prevalent style for the next several albums that followed. However, with 2015's The Plague Within, the band reincorporated low growls in some songs, a style which continued with 2017's Medusa and 2020's Obsidian.

In September 2014, it was officially announced that Holmes had replaced Mikael Åkerfeldt as the vocalist in the Swedish death metal band Bloodbath, taking the moniker Old Nick. He has thus far released three albums with the band, Grand Morbid Funeral (2014), The Arrow of Satan Is Drawn (2018) and Survival of the Sickest (2022).

Discography

with Paradise Lost

with Bloodbath
 Grand Morbid Funeral (2014, Peaceville Records)
 The Arrow of Satan is Drawn (2018, Peaceville Records)
 Survival of the Sickest (2022, Napalm Records)

with Host
 IX (2023, Nuclear Blast)

Guest appearances
3 AM - "Deus Ex Machina" - Liv Kristine (1998, Swanlake)
 For a Voice Like Thunder - "Rituals" - Rotting Christ (2016, Season of Mist)
 Gallows Bird - "Hour of the Nightingale" - Trees of Eternity - (2016, Svart Records)
 Wake Up the Coma - "Wake Up the Coma" - Front Line Assembly (2019, Metropolis Records) 
... and a Cross Now Marks His Place - Where Fear and Weapons Meet - 1914 (2021, Napalm Records)

Filmography
666 - At Calling Death (1993, documentary, directed: Matt Vain)
Over the Madness (2007, documentary, directed: Diran Noubar)

References

1971 births
Death metal musicians
Living people
English male singers
Bloodbath members
Paradise Lost (band) members
21st-century English singers
21st-century British male singers